A serious adverse event (SAE) in human drug trials is defined as any untoward medical occurrence that at any dose

Results in death
Is life-threatening
Requires inpatient hospitalization or causes prolongation of existing hospitalization
Results in persistent or significant disability/incapacity
May have caused a congenital anomaly/birth defect
Requires intervention to prevent permanent impairment or damage

The term "life-threatening" in the definition of "serious" refers to an event in which the patient was at risk of death at the time of the event; it does not refer to an event which hypothetically might have caused death if it were more severe. Adverse events are further defined as “Any untoward medical occurrence in a patient or clinical investigation subject administered a pharmaceutical product and which does not necessarily have to have a causal relationship with this treatment.”

Research
Investigators in human clinical trials are obligated to report these events in clinical study reports. Research suggests that these events are often inadequately reported in publicly available reports. Because of the lack of these data and uncertainty about methods for synthesising them, individuals conducting systematic reviews and meta-analyses of therapeutic interventions often unknowingly overemphasise health benefit.   To balance the overemphasis on benefit, scholars have called for more complete reporting of harm from clinical trials.

Related terms
Serious adverse reactions are serious adverse events judged to be related to drug therapy.  A SUSAR (suspected unexpected serious adverse reaction) should be reported to a drug regulatory authority under an investigational license by using the CIOMS form (or in some countries an equivalent form).  "Unexpected" means that for an authorised (approved) medicinal product that the event is not described in the product's labeling, or in the case of an investigational (unapproved) product that the event is not listed in the Investigator’s Brochure.

An adverse effect is an adverse event which is believed to be caused by a health intervention.

Footnotes

See also

 Adverse event, including mild/minor
 Clinical trial
 Good clinical practice (GCP)
 Data Monitoring Committees
 Pharmacovigilance
 EudraVigilance (European Union)
 Directive 2001/20/EC (European Union)
 TGN1412, a drug that had SAEs in a clinical trial
 BIA 10-2474, a drug that had SAEs, including a fatality, in a clinical trial

External links 
What Is A Serious Adverse Event? (MedWatch)
ClinicalTrials.gov from US National Library of Medicine
ICH Website

Clinical research
Pharmaceutical industry
Drug safety